Friedrich Robert Helmert (31 July 1843 – 15 June 1917) was a German geodesist and statistician with important contributions to the theory of errors.

Career
Helmert was born in Freiberg, Kingdom of Saxony. After schooling in Freiberg and Dresden, he entered the Polytechnische Schule, now Technische Universität, in Dresden to study engineering science in 1859. Finding him especially  enthusiastic about geodesy, one of his teachers, Christian August Nagel, hired him while still a student to work on the triangulation of the Erzgebirge and the drafting of the trigonometric network for Saxony. In 1863 Helmert became Nagel's assistant on the Central European Arc Measurement. After a year's study of mathematics and astronomy Helmert obtained his doctor's degree from the University of Leipzig in 1867 for a thesis based on his work for Nagel.

In 1870 Helmert became instructor and in 1872 professor at RWTH Aachen, the new Technical University in Aachen. At Aachen he wrote Die mathematischen und physikalischen Theorieen der höheren Geodäsie (Part I was published in 1880 and Part II in 1884). This work laid the foundations of modern geodesy. See history of geodesy.  Part I is devoted to the mathematical aspects of geodesy and contains a comprehensive
summary of techniques for solving for geodesics on an ellipsoid.

The method of least squares had been introduced into geodesy by Gauss and Helmert wrote a fine book on least squares (1872, with a second edition in 1907) in this tradition, which became a standard text. In 1876 he discovered the chi-squared distribution as the distribution of the sample variance for a normal distribution. This discovery and other of his work was described in German textbooks, including his own, but was unknown in English, and hence later rediscovered by English statisticians – the chi-squared distribution by Karl Pearson (1900), and the application to the sample variance by 'Student'  and Fisher.

From 1887 Helmert was professor of advanced geodesy at the University of Berlin and director of the Geodetic Institute. In 1916 he had a stroke and died of its effects the following year in Potsdam.

Honours
Helmert received many honours. He was president of the global geodetic association of "Internationale Erdmessung", member of the Prussian Academy of Sciences in Berlin, was elected a member of the Royal Swedish Academy of Sciences in 1905, and recipient of some 25 German and foreign decorations.

The lunar crater Helmert was named in his honor, approved by the IAU in 1973.

See also
Coordinate system
Gauss–Helmert model
Geodesics on an ellipsoid
Helmert's equation
Helmert transformation (in geodesy)
Helmert–Wolf blocking
National survey
Terrestrial gravity field

References

Works cited

General references
 Walther Fischer "Helmert, Friedrich Robert" Dictionary of Scientific Biography  volume 7, pp. 239–241, New York: Scribners 1973.
O. B. Sheynin (1995). "Helmert's work in the theory of errors". Archive for History of Exact Sciences, 49, 73–104. 
Die Genauigkeit der Formel von Peters zur Berechnung des wahrscheinlichen Fehlers director Beobachtungen gleicher Genauigkeit, Astron. Nach., 88, (1876), 192–218 An extract from the paper is translated and annotated in H. A. David & A. W. F. Edwards (eds.) Annotated Readings in the History of Statistics, New York: Springer 2001.

External links

Royal Society citation 1908 (very succinct)

There is an obituary at 
 MNRAS 78 (1918) 256

There is a photograph of Helmert at 
 Helmert on the Portraits of Statisticians page

and three more at
Helmert

See also 
memorial stone

The first edition of Helmert's textbook on least squares is available at the GDZ site
Die Ausgleichsrechnung nach der Methode der kleinsten Quadrate (Adjustment Computations by the Method of Least Squares)

A partial scan of Die mathematischen und physikalischen Theorieen der höheren Geodäsie (Part I) is available on the site
Friedrich Robert Helmert (1841–1917)

English translations (by the Aeronautical Chart and Information Center, St. Louis) of Parts I and II of Die mathematischen und physikalischen Theorieen der höheren Geodäsie are available at
doi:10.5281/zenodo.32050
doi:10.5281/zenodo.32051

There is an account of Helmert's work on the theory of errors in section 10.6 of 
Oscar Sheynin Theory of Probability: A Historical Essay

For eponymous terms in statistics see
Earliest known uses of some of the words of mathematics: A for the Abbe–Helmert criterion and Earliest known uses of some of the words of mathematics: H for the Helmert transformation.

1843 births
1917 deaths
German statisticians
German geodesists
People from the Kingdom of Saxony
Leipzig University alumni
Academic staff of RWTH Aachen University
Academic staff of the Humboldt University of Berlin
Members of the Prussian Academy of Sciences
Members of the Royal Swedish Academy of Sciences
Foreign Members of the Royal Society